Prototype is the debut album of garage duo Experimental Products (Mark Wilde and Michael Gross). This album was produced and released by the duo on vinyl in 1982. Wilde and Gross also produced the album's cover art.

It has since become a highly sought after collectors item. In 2008, Vinyl On Demand released an alternate album version with bonus "Garage Tracks".

Track listing 

1982 debut albums
Electronic albums by American artists